The Virginia Mountaineer is a weekly community newspaper focusing on Buchanan County, Virginia and surrounding areas in Central Appalachia. It is located out of Grundy, Virginia.

Weekly newspapers published in the United States
Publications established in 1922